Ibiyinka A. Fuwape (born 18 December 1962) is a Nigerian academic, professor in physics and the 2nd substantive Vice-Chancellor of the Michael and Cecilia Ibru University, a private university in Nigeria.

Early life 

Ibiyinka Fuwape was born in Lagos State on December 8, 1962 to the family of David Ademokun. She started her education at Reagan Memorial Baptist Girls Primary School, Yaba, Lagos, where she completed primary school. She proceeded to Methodist Girls High School where she earned her O Level certificate and earned her Higher School Certificate from 1979 to 1981 at Queen's College Yaba. In 1984, she earned her Bachelor of Science (B.Sc.) degree in Physics from the University of Ibadan with a first class honor and she undertook the National Youth Service Corps (NYSC) from 1984 to 1985. From the same university she earned her Master of Science (M.Sc.) and Doctor of Philosophy (PhD) degree in theoretical physics in 1986 and 1989 respectively.

Career

Ibiyinka started as an Assistant Lecturer in 1989 at the Federal University of Technology, Akure (FUTA) } She was promoted to Professor in October, 2003.  She served as coordinator in many offices in FUTA. She served as Acting Head of Department t and Head of the Physics Department for nine years. She served as Dean, School of Sciences from 2011 to 2015 and she won the award of Dean of the Year in 2012  She served as Chair/member of many Committees and Boards of FUTA. She was a member of the University Senate from 2003 to 2017. She repeatedly acted as Chairman of the Senate and as Committee of Deans during the 2014/2015 academic session

She was a member of the Governing Council of the Federal University of Technology, Akure, from 2012 to 2017. She also served as a member of Council of Ogun State (Moshood Abiola) Polytechnic Abeokuta from 2013 – 2016. She has supervised various students including undergraduates, Masters and PhD students theses. Her career has spanned over 30 years in the University Educational System.

Prof. Fuwape was a visiting scholar at Ohio University Athens, Ohio, United States of America (USA) from 2007-2009.  She has attended many scientific conferences at home and abroad. She has also organized many conferences at local, national and international levels. She mentors individuals including women into pursuing scientific disciplines and achieving excellence in life. She has published several papers in reputable journals both locally and internationally.

She was an Associate Member of the Abdus Salam Center for Theoretical Physics in Trieste, Italy, from 1996 to 2002. Her research at the Center focused on non-linear systems. She became a Team Leader for the International Union of Pure and Applied Physics working group for women in physics in 2002 and is still actively involved in the activities of this group.  In 2006 she became a Schlumberger Fellow, in a program established by the Schlumberger Foundation to support science and technology education.

Her current research is about chaotic dynamics of the lower atmosphere.

Honours and awards
Fuwape was the recipient of the American Physical Society's Marshak Lectureship in 2018. Her address at the meeting of the Society was on the topic 'Women in Physics in Nigeria and Other sub-Saharan African Countries: Progress and Challenges'. She was the  African Union Kwame Nkrumah Regional Award for Scientific Excellence, 2020 edition.

She was named a Fellow of the American Physical Society in 2022 "for decades of leadership in the advancement of women in physics in Nigeria and Africa, along with major research contributions solving problems in climate change, agriculture, and finance at the interface of physics and society, thereby benefiting economic development in Africa".

Personal life
She is married to Joseph Fuwape, the current vice Chancellor of federal University of technology Akure.

References

Bibliography
 
 
 

1962 births
Living people
Academic staff of the Federal University of Technology Akure
Vice-Chancellors of Nigerian universities
Nigerian physicists
Nigerian women physicists
Fellows of the American Physical Society